Vernon is a compact rural community in Osgoode Ward in the southern part of the city of Ottawa, Ontario, Canada. Prior to amalgamation in 2001, Vernon was located in Osgoode Township.

According to the Canada 2011 Census the surrounding blocks had a population of 750.

Churches and Temple 
 Osgoode Baptist Church
 Osgoode Presbyterian Church
 St. George's Anglican Church
 Vernon United Church
 Canada Ottawa Amitabha

Library 
The Vernon branch of the Ottawa Public Library makes its home in an 1882 heritage building that was the community's one-room schoolhouse. It was recently renovated to have a new washroom and bell tower. The library has a wheelchair ramp.

Museum 
Vernon is the home of the Osgoode Township Historical Society and Museum. It was founded by a group of dedicated senior citizens working with a New Horizons grant. The large body of archival material and artifacts reflect the agricultural history of the Township of Osgoode.

Post Office 
Effective Oct 1, 2017 Vernon has no post office. Residents collect their mail in Community Mail Boxes (CMBs) dispersed throughout the village. Items that are too large for the CMBs are brought to the post office in Metcalfe, north of Vernon.

Formerly the Vernon post office was located in the old Ford Motor dealership.

References

Neighbourhoods in Ottawa